Raphidiocystis is a genus of flowering plants belonging to the family Cucurbitaceae.

Its native range is Tropical Africa, Madagascar.

Species:

Raphidiocystis brachypoda 
Raphidiocystis chrysocoma 
Raphidiocystis jeffreyana 
Raphidiocystis mannii 
Raphidiocystis phyllocalyx

References

Cucurbitaceae
Cucurbitaceae genera